Trishuli Hydropower Station is a peaking run-of-river hydropower station located at Trishuli bazaar of Nuwakot district in Nepal. The intake of the plant lies in Rasuwa district.The plant was constructed in 1976 with an installed capacity of 21 MW (7 units, 3 MW each). The plant was upgraded to 37 MW. The project was developed jointly by the Government of India and the Government of Nepal. The project cost was INR 140 million. The annual energy generation is 304.78 GWh.Nepal Electricity Authority, a government-run organization, owns and operates this plant. Another power station Devighat Hydropower Station is a cascade project to this power station.

The design flow is  	45.66 m3/s and the rated head is 51.4 m.

See also 

Nepal Electricity Authority

References

Hydroelectric power stations in Nepal
Gravity dams
Run-of-the-river power stations
Dams in Nepal
1967 establishments in Nepal
Buildings and structures in Rasuwa District